James Schine Crown (born June 25, 1953) is an American businessman and heir. He is president of Henry Crown and Company, a family investment company. He is a director of JPMorgan Chase & Co., General Dynamics and Sara Lee. He is also the managing partner of the Aspen Skiing Company.

Early life
Crown was born the son of  Renée (née Schine) and  Lester Crown. His mother is the sister of producer G. David Schine and the daughter of theater and hotel magnate, Junius Myer Schine. His grandfather is Chicago industrialist Henry Crown. His sister is Susan Crown.

Career 
In 1976, Crown earned a BA from Hampshire College in Amherst, Massachusetts and a J.D. degree from Stanford Law School in 1980. He served as chairman of the board of trustees of the University of Chicago from 2003 to 2009. After law school, Crown worked as an associate for Salomon Brothers in New York City where he became a vice president in the Capital Markets Service Group in 1983.

In 1985, he returned to Chicago to join his family's investment firm.

Personal life
In 1985, Crown married Paula Hannaway, a 1980 magna cum laude A.B. graduate of Duke University and 2012 M.A. graduate of School of the Art Institute of Chicago. The couple has four children.

References

1953 births
Businesspeople from Chicago
American people of Lithuanian-Jewish descent
Directors of JPMorgan Chase
Hampshire College alumni
Living people
Stanford Law School alumni